Barnard 147 is a narrow, snake-like dark nebula in the Cygnus constellation.  It is a well-defined dark lane near open cluster NGC 6871.

Barnard 146 is in close proximity to 147, to the SW of star BD +35 3930.

References

External links

 Barnard's Catalog

Dark nebulae
147
Cygnus (constellation)